Kalinovka is a rural locality (a selo) in Chernushinsky District, Perm Krai, Russia. The population was 512 as of 2010. There are 3 streets.

Geography 
Kalinovka is located 38 km northeast of Chernushka (the district's administrative centre) by road. Korobeyniki is the nearest rural locality.

References 

Rural localities in Chernushinsky District